Zlodol is a village in the municipality of Bajina Bašta, Serbia. At the time of the 2002 census, the village had a population of 419 people.

References

Populated places in Zlatibor District